Chobotarivka is a village in Ukraine, Odesa Raion of Odesa Oblast. It belongs to Usatove rural hromada, one of the hromadas of Ukraine. The population is 243.

It uses the local timezone which is named Europe/Kyiv with an UTC offset of 2 hours. The closest airport in Chobotarivka is the Odesa International Airport in a distance of 17 mi (or 28 km), South.

Until 18 July 2020, Chobotarivka belonged to Biliaivka Raion. The raion was abolished in July 2020 as part of the administrative reform of Ukraine, which reduced the number of raions of Odesa Oblast to seven. The area of Biliaivka Raion was merged into Odesa Raion.

List of places near Chobotarivka 
This show places near Chobotarivka within a 200 km range.

See also 
 Danube Delta

References 

Villages in Odesa Raion
Usatove Hromada